is a Japanese footballer currently playing as a midfielder for Arsenal Tivat.

Career statistics

Club

Notes

References

1996 births
Living people
Sportspeople from Osaka Prefecture
Association football people from Osaka Prefecture
Osaka Sangyo University alumni
Japanese footballers
Japanese expatriate footballers
Association football midfielders
Montenegrin Second League players
FK Zlatibor Čajetina players
Serbian First League players
Japanese expatriate sportspeople in Serbia
Expatriate footballers in Serbia
Japanese expatriate sportspeople in Montenegro
Expatriate footballers in Montenegro